Jakob Nirschl, sometimes shown as Jakob Nirschel (April 23, 1925 – 1997) was a West German bobsledder who competed in the mid-1950s. He won a bronze medal in the four-man event at the 1955 FIBT World Championships in St. Moritz. Nirschl also finished eighth in the four-man event at the 1956 Winter Olympics in Cortina d'Ampezzo.

References
Bobsleigh four-man world championship medalists since 1930
Wallenchinsky, David. (1984). "Bobsled: Four-man". In The Complete Book of the Olympics: 1896-1980. New York: Penguin Books. p. 561.
Biography of Jakob Nirschl 

1925 births
1997 deaths
Bobsledders at the 1956 Winter Olympics
German male bobsledders
Olympic bobsledders of the United Team of Germany